Christopher Willoughby (by 1508 – 1570), of West Knoyle, Wiltshire, was an English politician.

Family
Willoughby was the illegitimate son of Sir William Willoughby of Turners Puddle, Dorset. He was probably educated at Lincoln's Inn. He married twice. Firstly he married a woman named Alice, the widow of one Bulstrode. At some point by 1547, he had married his second wife, Isabel née Wykes, a daughter of Nicholas Wykes of Dodington, Gloucestershire, widow of John Ringwood of Sherfield English, Hampshire, by whom he had four sons and four daughters.

Career
He was a Member (MP) of the Parliament of England for Wilton in 1545 and for Wiltshire in November 1554.

References

1570 deaths
People from Wiltshire
English MPs 1545–1547
English MPs 1554–1555
Members of Parliament for Wilton
Year of birth uncertain